Ronald "Ron" Evans (birth registered second ¼ 1933  – 31 October 2010), also known by the nickname of "Curly", was an English professional rugby league footballer who played in the 1950s and 1960s.

Background
Ron Evans' birth was registered in Pontefract district, West Riding of Yorkshire, England, he lived in Ferry Fryston, Castleford , he died aged 77 in Castleford, West Yorkshire, England, his funeral service took place at Holy Cross Church, Castleford, at 12.15 pm on Monday 8 November 2010. followed by an interment at Castleford Cemetery.

Playing career

Club career
Ron Evans made his début for Wakefield Trinity during November 1950, and he played his last match for Wakefield Trinity during the 1955–56 season, he appears to have scored no drop-goals (or field-goals as they are currently known in Australasia), but prior to the 1974–75 season all goals, whether; conversions, penalties, or drop-goals, scored 2-points, consequently prior to this date drop-goals were often not explicitly documented, therefore '0' drop-goals may indicate drop-goals not recorded, rather than no drop-goals scored.

Genealogical information
Ron Evans' marriage to Irene (née Robinson) was registered during second ¼ 1955 in Pontefract district They had children; Gary Evans (birth registered second ¼  in Wakefield district). Ron Evans was the brother-in-law of the rugby league footballer Don Robinson.

References

External links
Obituary - Wakefield Express
Search for "Evans" at rugbyleagueproject.org
Ronald Evans Memory Box Search at archive.castigersheritage.com
Ron Evans Memory Box Search at archive.castigersheritage.com

1933 births
2010 deaths
Castleford Tigers players
English rugby league players
Rugby league halfbacks
Rugby league players from Pontefract
Wakefield Trinity players